Saghatherium was a genus of herbivorous hyrax that lived during the Oligocene period and what is now in Egypt, Libya and Oman.

References 

Prehistoric hyraxes
Fossil taxa described in 1902
Prehistoric placental genera